Anchycteis is a genus of toe-winged beetles in the family Ptilodactylidae. There is one described species in Anchycteis, A. velutina.

References

Further reading

 

Byrrhoidea
Articles created by Qbugbot